Minuscule 701 (in the Gregory-Aland numbering), ε1405 (von Soden), is a Greek minuscule manuscript of the New Testament, on parchment. Palaeographically it has been assigned to the 14th century. The manuscript has complex contents. Scrivener labelled it by 523e.

Description 

The codex contains the text of the New Testament on 170 parchment leaves (size ) The text is written in one column per page, 22 lines per page. The text of Matthew 23:1-20 was supplied by a later hand.

There is also a division according to the Ammonian Sections, with references to the Eusebian Canons.

Text 

Kurt Aland did not place the Greek text of the codex in any Category.

It was not examined by using the Claremont Profile Method.

History 

Scrivener dated the manuscript to the 13th century, Gregory dated the manuscript to the 14th century. Currently the manuscript is dated by the INTF to the 14th century.

The manuscript once belonged to the Metropolitan Church in Heraclea near Propontis. Thomas Payne, chaplain in the British embassy in Constantinople, presented the manuscript to Charles Herzog, Duke of Marlborough, in 1738. It was held in Belsheim 3.B.14, and in the family of White in London, Gregory saw it in 1883.

It was added to the list of New Testament manuscript by Scrivener (523) and Gregory (701).

It was examined and described by Dean Burgon.

Currently the owner of the manuscript and place of its housing is unknown.

See also 

 List of New Testament minuscules
 Biblical manuscript
 Textual criticism

References

Further reading 

 

Greek New Testament minuscules
14th-century biblical manuscripts
Lost biblical manuscripts